St Cuthbert's Church is in the village of Crayke, North Yorkshire, England.  It is an active Anglican parish church in the deanery of Easingwold, the archdeaconry of York, and the diocese of York.  Its benefice is united with those of All Saints, Brandsby, and Holy Trinity, Yearsley.  The church is recorded in the National Heritage List for England as a designated Grade II listed building.

History

The present church dates from about 1490 on a site probably occupied by a church in the Anglo-Saxon era.  The church was restored and a north aisle was added by the Lancaster architect E. G. Paley in 1862–63, at a cost of £1,000 (equivalent to £ in ).

Architecture

The church is constructed in ashlar stone in Perpendicular style.  The plan consists of a three-bay nave with a north aisle and a south porch, a two-bay chancel, and a west tower.  The church is battlemented throughout with pinnacles and gargoyles.  The tower is in two stages, with a three-light west window in the lower stage and two-light bell openings in the upper stage.  The east window has three lights, and contains stained glass by William Wailes.  The font is from the 15th century, and the pulpit is dated 1637.  The pews date from the 17th century.  In the church is a late 16th-century memorial with recumbent stone effigies.

See also

List of ecclesiastical works by E. G. Paley

References

Church of England church buildings in North Yorkshire
Diocese of York
Grade II listed churches in North Yorkshire
English Gothic architecture in North Yorkshire
Gothic Revival architecture in North Yorkshire
Church buildings by E. G. Paley